Stenopsocus is a genus of insects belonging to the family Stenopsocidae.

The species of this genus are found in Europe, Southeastern Asia and Australia.

Species:

Stenopsocus abnormis 
Stenopsocus adisoemartoi 
Stenopsocus albipileus 
Stenopsocus albus 
Stenopsocus anchorocaulis 
Stenopsocus angustifurcus 
Stenopsocus angustistriatus 
Stenopsocus anthracinus 
Stenopsocus apertus 
Stenopsocus aphidiformis 
Stenopsocus aphidiformis 
Stenopsocus aureus 
Stenopsocus baishanzuensis 
Stenopsocus beijingensis 
Stenopsocus bellatulus 
Stenopsocus betulus 
Stenopsocus beunifascus 
Stenopsocus bicoloratus 
Stenopsocus bicoloratus 
Stenopsocus bicoloriceps 
Stenopsocus biconicus 
Stenopsocus biconvexus 
Stenopsocus bimaculatus 
Stenopsocus bipunctatus 
Stenopsocus bombusus 
Stenopsocus brachychelus 
Stenopsocus brachycladus 
Stenopsocus brachyodicrus 
Stenopsocus brevicapitus 
Stenopsocus brevivalvaris 
Stenopsocus capacimacularus 
Stenopsocus cassideus 
Stenopsocus ceuthozibrinus 
Stenopsocus changbaishanicus 
Stenopsocus chebalingensis 
Stenopsocus chunfengae 
Stenopsocus chusanensis 
Stenopsocus concisus 
Stenopsocus coronatus 
Stenopsocus coronatus 
Stenopsocus cunnatus 
Stenopsocus dactylinus 
Stenopsocus daozheniensis 
Stenopsocus denivalvis 
Stenopsocus dichospilus 
Stenopsocus dictyodromus 
Stenopsocus disphaeroides 
Stenopsocus dissimilis 
Stenopsocus emeishanicus 
Stenopsocus eucallus 
Stenopsocus externus 
Stenopsocus falcatus 
Stenopsocus fanjingshanicus 
Stenopsocus fastigiatus 
Stenopsocus faungi 
Stenopsocus flavicapitus 
Stenopsocus flavicaudatus 
Stenopsocus flavifrons 
Stenopsocus flavinigrus 
Stenopsocus floralis 
Stenopsocus foliaceus 
Stenopsocus formosanus 
Stenopsocus frontalis 
Stenopsocus frontimaculatus 
Stenopsocus fulivertex 
Stenopsocus furcimaculatus 
Stenopsocus gannanensis 
Stenopsocus gannanensis 
Stenopsocus gansuensis 
Stenopsocus genostictus 
Stenopsocus gibbulosus 
Stenopsocus gracilimaculatus 
Stenopsocus gracillimus 
Stenopsocus guizhouiensis 
Stenopsocus hamaocaulis 
Stenopsocus hemiostictus 
Stenopsocus hexagonus 
Stenopsocus huangshanicus 
Stenopsocus hunanicus 
Stenopsocus immaculatus 
Stenopsocus isotomus 
Stenopsocus jocosus 
Stenopsocus kunmingiensis 
Stenopsocus lachlani 
Stenopsocus lacteus 
Stenopsocus laterimaculatus 
Stenopsocus lemniscsingulaeis 
Stenopsocus leucoresbius 
Stenopsocus lifashengi 
Stenopsocus liuae 
Stenopsocus liupanshanensis 
Stenopsocus locularis 
Stenopsocus longicuspis 
Stenopsocus longitudinalis 
Stenopsocus macrocheirus 
Stenopsocus macrostigmis 
Stenopsocus maculosus 
Stenopsocus majusculus 
Stenopsocus makii 
Stenopsocus maximalis 
Stenopsocus melanocephalus 
Stenopsocus mesozonalis 
Stenopsocus metastictus 
Stenopsocus naevicapitatus 
Stenopsocus nepalensis 
Stenopsocus niger 
Stenopsocus nigricellus 
Stenopsocus obscurus 
Stenopsocus oculimaculatus 
Stenopsocus orbiculatus 
Stenopsocus ovalimacularis 
Stenopsocus pallidus 
Stenopsocus palmatus 
Stenopsocus parviforficatus 
Stenopsocus pavonicus 
Stenopsocus paxillivalvaris 
Stenopsocus pellucidus 
Stenopsocus percussus 
Stenopsocus periostictus 
Stenopsocus perspicuus 
Stenopsocus phaeostigmis 
Stenopsocus phaeostigmus 
Stenopsocus phaneostriatus 
Stenopsocus pilosus 
Stenopsocus platynotus 
Stenopsocus platyocephalus 
Stenopsocus platytaenius 
Stenopsocus podorphus 
Stenopsocus polyceratus 
Stenopsocus pygmaeus 
Stenopsocus pyriformis 
Stenopsocus qianipullus 
Stenopsocus quaternatus 
Stenopsocus radimaculatus 
Stenopsocus revolutus 
Stenopsocus rubellus 
Stenopsocus shennongjiaensis 
Stenopsocus sichuanicus 
Stenopsocus signatipennis 
Stenopsocus silvaticus 
Stenopsocus spilipsocius 
Stenopsocus spongiosus 
Stenopsocus stigmaticus 
Stenopsocus striolatus 
Stenopsocus symipsarous 
Stenopsocus thermophilus 
Stenopsocus tianmushanensis 
Stenopsocus tibialis 
Stenopsocus tonkinensis 
Stenopsocus tribulbus 
Stenopsocus trinotatus 
Stenopsocus tripartibilis 
Stenopsocus trisetus 
Stenopsocus turgidus 
Stenopsocus uniformis 
Stenopsocus valvilacteus 
Stenopsocus wangi 
Stenopsocus wuxiaensis 
Stenopsocus xanthophaeus 
Stenopsocus xanthostigmus 
Stenopsocus xiangxiensis 
Stenopsocus xilingxianicus 
Stenopsocus yuensis 
Stenopsocus zonatus

References

Stenopsocidae
Psocoptera genera